Turbinicarpus alonsoi is a species of plant in the family Cactaceae. It is endemic to Mexico.  Its natural habitat is hot deserts.

Cultivation
Turbinicarpus alonsoi is easily grown in cultivation, however due to its large taproot, it requires porous soil with plenty of inorganic material such as stones and dries as quickly as possible. Water infrequently and only when it is dry. Full sun to part shade is preferred, as it will encourage slow, compact and steady growth during spring and summer months.  During its winter quiescent period, keep dry to prevent rot.

References

External links
 
 
 

alonsoi
Cacti of Mexico
Endemic flora of Mexico
Critically endangered plants
Endangered biota of Mexico
Taxonomy articles created by Polbot